Bob Loubser (6 August 1884 – 7 December 1962) was a South African international rugby union player who played as a wing.

He played in 7 tests for South Africa from 1903 - 1910 scoring 3 tries. He also scored a record 22 tries during the Springbok's 1906-tour to the British Isles.

References

South African rugby union players
South Africa international rugby union players
People from the City of Cape Town
1884 births
1962 deaths
Rugby union wings
Western Province (rugby union) players